"Jag tror på oss" is a song written by Lars "Dille" Diedricson, Martin Hedström and Ingela "Pling" Forsman, and performed by the Swedish band Scotts at Melodifestivalen 2009. Through the semifinal in Gothenburg on 7 February 2009, the song went to Andra chansen where it failed to reach the finals.

The song peaked at 3rd place on the Swedish singles chart. The song was also tested for Svensktoppen on 12 April 2009 but failed to go through.

Later in 2009, the song was also added as a bonus track on the Scotts album Längtan.

After Dark was originally asked to participate with the song, but declined following scheduling problems.

Charts

References

External links 

Information at Svensk mediedatabas

2009 songs
2009 singles
Swedish-language songs
Melodifestivalen songs of 2009
Songs with lyrics by Ingela Forsman
Scotts (band) songs
Songs written by Lars Diedricson